Brain Quest 5 & 6 is an educational video game released for Nintendo DS in North America on September 22, 2008.  The game was released at the same time as Brain Quest Grades 3 & 4. Staying true to the curriculum-based card deck series Brain Quest, it contains over 6,000 unique questions, developed specifically for American fifth grade and sixth grade levels.

References

External links
 GameSpot Summary

2008 video games
Electronic Arts games
Nintendo DS games
Nintendo DS-only games
Planet Moon Studios games
Puzzle video games
Video games based on works
Video games developed in the United States